Llangyfelach is an electoral ward in the county of Swansea, Wales, UK. It covers the communities of Llangyfelach and part of Mawr.

The electoral ward consists of some or all of the following settlements: Llangyfelach, Pantlasau, Treboeth and Felindre, in the parliamentary constituency of Gower.  The ward is bounded by the ward of Clydach to the east; Morriston, Mynydd-Bach and Penderry to the south east; Pontarddulais to te west; Pontlliw and Tircoed and Penllergaer to the south west.

2022 ward boundary changes
Following a local government boundary review the Llangyfelach ward significantly increased in size. Though it lost Pontlliw and Tircoed (which together became a new ward) it gained the community ward of Felindre from the former Mawr ward (which was disbanded).

Local election results
At the May 2022 local council elections, the turnout for Llangyfelach increased to 50.28%, with independent candidate Mark Tribe winning the election for the Independents@Swansea group:

For the May 2012 local council elections, the turnout for Llangyfelach was 29.93%.  The election results were:

References

External links
Llangyfelach ward info

Swansea electoral wards